Navar (also Romanized as Navār; also known as Nuwar) is a village in Razan Rural District, in the Central District of Razan County, Hamadan Province, Iran. At the 2006 census, its population was 1,574, in 393 families.

The 14th-century author Hamdallah Mustawfi listed Navar as one of the main villages in the A‘lam district under Hamadan.

References 

Populated places in Razan County